Michael Sherwin Harris Browne is a politician from Antigua and Barbuda. Browne is the current MP for All Saints West for the Antigua and Barbuda Labour Party.

Political career 
In 2020, Browne resigned as Minister of Education, Science and Technology in the Cabinet of Antigua and Barbuda.

References 

Living people
20th-century births
Government ministers of Antigua and Barbuda
Members of the House of Representatives (Antigua and Barbuda)
21st-century politicians

University of the West Indies alumni
Antigua and Barbuda Labour Party politicians